The Creswick Football Netball Club is an Australian rules football and netball club that plays in the Central Highlands Football League and is based in the town of Creswick, Victoria.

History 
The Creswick Football Club was founded in 1869 and its first recorded game was July 24 that same year against Kingston, with the result being a 0-0 draw. The club played in 1876 against Clunes and Daylesford, winning both games 1 goal to 0. Between 1869 and 1914, the name of the league where the Wickers played changed almost yearly but the league was often known as the 'Challenge Cup'. There was no football between 1870 and 1875 due to floods.

The Creswick District Football Association was founded in 1914, with Creswick joined by clubs from Dean, Smeaton, Newlyn and Allendale & Broomfield. Creswick won the premiership from Newlyn, and repeated the dose in 1915.  There was a suspension of football in the league due to World War I which lasted from 1916 to 1918, with the league ultimately ceasing existence in early 1935. Creswick joined the Ballarat First Rate Association in 1929 and stayed until 1931 before they joined the Clunes Football Association from 1932 to 1940 while fielding a seconds team in the Creswick Association. Creswick's ground hosted what turned out to be the last CDFA grand final between Springmount and Allendale. In 1941, Creswick left the Clunes association and went back to the BFA where World War II was the cause of no football from 1941 to 1944. Creswick shifted back to the Clunes competition in 1950 where they stayed until 1978 before joining the newly-formed Central Highlands Football League as a founding member. They are currently affiliated with the CHFL and continue to field junior and senior football and netball teams. Creswick relocated its home ground of 143 years at Hammon Park to a new venue at Doug Lindsay Reserve in 2012.

A-Grade Premierships 
Creswick District Football Association: 1914, 1915, 1919, 1923, 1925, 1926

Clunes Football Association: 1940

Clunes Football League: 1950, 1961, 1974

Central Highlands Football League premierships 
A-Grade: 1987

B-Grade: 1981, 1986, 1987, 1988

U18: 1979, 1990, 1995, 2006

U15: 1985, 1986, 1992,1993, 1995, 2003, 2008, 2011, 2015

VFL/AFL players

 Dinny Heagney - Geelong
 Jack Wunhym - Footscray 
 John McDonald - Hawthorn 
 Jimmy Stephenson - St Kilda
 Brian Hepper - Fitzroy
 Greg Dowd - Footscray 
 Eric Clarke - St Kilda 
 Peter Huntley - St Kilda 
 Ron Gladman - St Kilda
 Matthew Capuano - North Melbourne, St Kilda.

References

External links 
 

1869 establishments in Australia
Australian rules football clubs established in 1869
Australian rules football clubs in Victoria (Australia)
Netball teams in Victoria (Australia)